Thozhilali is a 1964 Indian Tamil-language film directed by M. A. Thirumugam and produced by Sandow M. M. A. Chinnappa Thevar who also wrote the story. Inspired by Thevar's early life as a milk supplier before he became a wealthy film producer, it stars M. G. Ramachandran, K. R. Vijaya and newcomer Rathna. The film was released on 25 September 1964 and became a box-office success.

Plot 

Raju, a relentless worker, is the only son of a widow of peasant origin, which in spite of the economic difficulties, makes a success, in parallel, of brilliant of high studies. We see him climbing, not without happiness and problems, the social scale, via diverse jobs, arousing in the passage, the jealousy of his rich neighbours. But his effort will be rewarded in the measure for hard sound labour, in the person of beautiful and intelligent Vijaya. Raju joins a bus company and earns the respect of boss Murugappan. Murugappan's daughter Meena falls for Raju but he refuses to marry her and is thrown out of the company.

Cast 
Male cast
 M. G. Ramachandran as Raju
 M. N. Nambiar as Velu
 S. A. Ashokan as M. Murugappa
 Nagesh as Kithan

Female cast
 K. R. Vijaya as Meena
 Rathna as Vijaya
 Manorama as Chandira
 S. N. Lakshmi as Raju 's mother

Production 
Thozhilali marked the acting debut of Rathna. The film was inspired by Sandow M. M. A. Chinnappa Thevar's early life as a milk supplier before he became a wealthy film producer in a rags to riches manner. While Thevar himself wrote the story, Aaroor Dass wrote the dialogues.

Soundtrack 
The soundtrack was composed by K. V. Mahadevan.

Release and reception 
Thozhilali was released on 25 September 1964. Writing for Sport and Pastime, T. M. Ramachandran praised M. A. Thirumugam's direction, saying he has "shown much improvement in skill and ability as a box-office wizard" and also praised N. S. Varma's cinematography and performances of the artistes. The film became a box-office success, running for over 100 days in theatres.

References

External links 
 

1960s Tamil-language films
1964 films
Films directed by M. A. Thirumugam
Films scored by K. V. Mahadevan